Domingo Sánchez may refer to:

 Domingo Francisco Sánchez (1795-1870), Paraguayan politician and statesman who served as Vice President of Paraguay
 Domingo Sánchez (wrestler) (1899-1961), Spanish wrestler
 Domingo Sánchez (footballer) (born 1972), Argentine football manager and former footballer